The Sketch Show is a British television sketch comedy programme, featuring many leading British comedians. It aired on ITV between 2001 and 2004. The show was first commissioned in 2001 and was co-produced by a company owned by Steve Coogan. Despite the first series winning the BAFTA Television Award for Best Comedy, the second series was cancelled due to poor viewing figures. Lee Mack states in his autobiography Mack The Life that the final two episodes have never been broadcast.

A spinoff of the same title was produced in the United States. Similarly to the UK version, the final two episodes were never broadcast.

The show started at the Edinburgh Festival Fringe in 1999, and starred Mack, Catherine Tate and Dan Antopolski. Mack later expressed regret at not including them in the TV show, stating: "I'm not a great believer in regret, but looking back over the last eighteen years of me doing this job, not keeping our sketch show Bits together and jumping at the first offer to put a version of it on telly is probably the biggest mistake I've made."

Cast 
The original line-up of the cast was Lee Mack, Jim Tavaré, Tim Vine, Karen Taylor and Ronni Ancona.

For the second series, Kitty Flanagan replaced Ancona, who left to concentrate on BBC One's Alistair McGowan's Big Impression (which was shortened to simply Big Impression to reflect Ancona playing as many parts as McGowan himself). Again, sketches featured performers using their own names.

With the exception of some child actors in certain sketches, there were no guest stars at any point during the programme.

Writers 
All of the cast contributed to the writing of the show; however, Lee Mack is credited as the lead writer. Other comedic writers/actors, such as Jimmy Carr, John Archer, Ricky Gervais, Matthew Hardy, Stephen Colledge and Daniel Maier were also responsible for the show's humour, though as mentioned earlier, were not featured in the show.

DVD 
A DVD of the first season was released by Visual Entertainment in Australia on 12 September 2005. It is a region-free DVD and the only extra on the disc is a short photo gallery. All 8 episodes on the single-disc release are combined into a 3-hour feature. The opening and closing credits have been removed for all episodes, and a number of sketches have been edited out to fit the series onto a single disc.

International versions

United States 
An American version of the show, produced by Kelsey Grammer, aired in early 2005 on Fox. The main cast consisted of Malcolm Barrett, Kaitlin Olson, Mary Lynn Rajskub, and Paul F. Tompkins, as well as Lee Mack from the British version of the show. Grammer appeared in short opening and closing segments in each episode.

Many of the sketches from the British version were recreated, such as the California Dreamin', English Course, and Sign Language sketches.

A notable sketch from this version had Grammer waking up from a nightmare, which he describes as: "I dreamt that Frasier was over, and I was on this Sketch Show!" The sketch is a spoof of the Newhart series finale.

The series was filmed in London, England at Teddington Studios, with a British audience.

Only six episodes of the show were made, and it was cancelled after only four of them had been shown, but all six were aired.

It was replaced by American Dad! on 6 February 2005.

Canada 
A Quebec version ran between 2004 and 2006 on the channel TVA. Most sketches in this version are translations or adaptations of British and Australian sketches with little original material. The main cast consisted of Emmanuel Bilodeau, Réal Bossé, Édith Cochrane, Catherine De Sève and Sylvain Marcel.

Germany 
A German version called Die Sketch Show has been on the air since 2003. It was produced by Brainpool for the TV channel ProSieben. Mack states in his autobiography that the show also utilised sketches that were written by the UK team but never recorded.

Greece 
A sketch show called Skertsakia (a play on Sketch and Scherzo) was broadcast during the 2006-2007 season, incorporated scripts from both seasons of the Sketch Show along with sketches from the Spanish comedy show Splunge!
It was wildly popular with young demographics and produced 30 episodes and a Christmas special. It was produced by TFG Lt. for ANT1.

Israel 
An Israeli version called Ktsarim (literally shorts) aired from 2004 to 2009. One of the episodes featured a sketch heavily inspired by the California Dreamin' sketch, with the song "HaTishma Koli".

Indonesia 
An Indonesian version called Sketsa aired from 2008 to 2015 on Trans TV. Most sketches in this version are translations or adaptations of British sketches with little original material. The humour style remains faithful to the original. They only change the names and locations to Indonesian version.

Italy 
An Italian version called Sketch Show has been on air since October 2010. The cast was principally made of Ale e Franz, two Italian famous comic actors. There were other actors and also live sketches, sometimes with famous guests.

Mexico
A Mexican version called Sketch Show Mexico has been on air since 2005.

References

External links 

2001 British television series debuts
2004 British television series endings
2000s British television sketch shows
English-language television shows
ITV sketch shows
Television shows shot at Teddington Studios